Lévi Doré (born 2000) is a Canadian actor from Quebec. He is most noted for his performance in the film The Fall of Sparta (La chute de sparte), for which he received a Prix Iris nomination for Revelation of the Year at the 21st Quebec Cinema Awards.

He has also appeared in the films Pauvre Georges! and Sam, and in the television series Au secours de Béatrice and Alerte amber.

References

External links

2000 births
21st-century Canadian male actors
Canadian male child actors
Canadian male film actors
Canadian male stage actors
Canadian male television actors
Male actors from Quebec
French Quebecers
Living people
Place of birth missing (living people)